is the 14th single by Japanese idol duo Wink. Written by Neko Oikawa and Takashi Kudō, the single was released on March 25, 1992, by Polystar Records.

Background and release 
"Matenrō Museum" was used as the ending theme of the Fuji TV quiz show .

"Matenrō Museum" peaked at No. 4 on the Oricon's weekly charts and sold over 142,000 copies.

Track listing 
All lyrics are written by Neko Oikawa; all music is composed by Takashi Kudō; all music is arranged by Satoshi Kadokura.

Chart positions 
Weekly charts

Year-end charts

References

External links 
 
 

1992 singles
1992 songs
Wink (duo) songs
Japanese-language songs
Songs with lyrics by Neko Oikawa